A duke is an aristocrat of very high rank.

Duke or The Duke may also refer to:

 Duke University, a private research university in Durham, North Carolina

Geography
 Duke, Missouri, an unincorporated community
 Duke (Kiseljak), a village in Bosnia and Herzegovina
 Duke Township, Harnett County, North Carolina
 Duke Township, Jackson County, Oklahoma – see List of Oklahoma townships
 (The) Duke City, a nickname for Albuquerque, New Mexico
 Duke Island (Alaska)
 La Duke Island, Nunavut, Canada

People
 Duke (nickname), a list of people
 Duke (given name), a list of people
 Duke (surname), including a list of people

Fictional characters
 Bo, Luke, Daisy and Jesse Duke from the American television series 
 Edmund Duke (StarCraft)
 Duke (G.I. Joe), from the G.I. Joe TV series, toy line and comic book series
 Uncle Duke, from Doonesbury
 Tony "Duke" Evers, in the Rocky films
 Duke Lavery, on the American soap opera General Hospital
 Duke, from KOF: Maximum Impact
 Duke, a narrow-gauge engine created by Rev W Awdry in The Railway Series and Thomas and Friends
 Duke of New York, aka "The Duke, A Number One", gang leader in Escape from New York
 Duke Nukem (character), the protagonist in over a dozen video games
 Duke, protagonist of the eponymous novel by Hal Ellson
 Duke, the family dog in the television series The Beverly Hillbillies
 Duke, an anthropomorphic dog with a southern accent in the comic Kelly & Duke
 Duke, a golden retriever who appears in commercials of Tennessee food producer Bush Brothers and Company (Bush's Baked Beans)
 Duke, the dog from Barnyard (film)
 Duke, a dog from The Secret Life of Pets
 Duke Forrest, from the film version of M*A*S*H
 Duke, a POW from the play and film Stalag 17
 Duke Oda, the player in the game Cyber Police ESWAT
 Duke Caboom, in Toy Story 4

Sports
 Duke Blue Devils, the athletic teams of Duke University
 The Duke (racehorse), a 19th-century racing champion
 "The Duke", the official nickname of the game ball used in the National Football League of American football

In business
 TVNZ Duke, a New Zealand television channel
 Dukes Aerospace, a valve manufacturer and subsidiary of TransDigm Group
 Duke Energy, a producer of gas and electric services in the United States
 Dukes Hotel, a luxury hotel in London
 Duke Realty, a real estate investment trust in the United States
 Duke Records, a Memphis, Tennessee record label active from 1952 to 1973
 Duke Video, Motorsport DVD distributor based in the Isle of Man

In the military
 , various ships and a shore establishment of the Royal Navy
 Duke Field, a US Air Force airport in Florida
 Forward Operating Base Duke, a former US base in Iraq

Transportation
 Beechcraft Duke, a twin-engined airplane developed by Beechcraft in the 1960s and manufactured until 1983
 Duke motorcycles, such as the KTM 690 Duke and the KTM 390 Duke
 The Duke, a short-lived 0-6-0 steam locomotive built in 1817 by George Stephenson for the Kilmarnock and Troon Railway
 GWR 3252 Class, or Duke Class, steam locomotive

Technology 

 Duke (mascot), the mascot of the Java programming language
 Duke butterflies, species of the brush-footed butterfly genera
 Duke, an electronic countermeasure (jammer) specifically designed for radio-controlled improvised explosive devices (RCIED)
 Xbox Controller, often nicknamed the Duke

Culture and language 
 Duke language, an Oceanic language

Film and television
 Duke (film), a 2019 crime drama film
 The Duke (TV series), 1954
 The Duke (miniseries), 1979
 The Duke (TV talk show), 2009, TV talk show for men by AXN Asia
 The Duke (1999 film), a 1999 Disney film
 The Duke (1998 film), a 1998 short film
 The Duke (2020 film), 2020 comedy-drama film

Music

Bands and musicians
 Duke Ellington, American jazz pianist, composer and arranger
 Duke (musician), a British vocalist/songwriter/composer/producer
 Rich Ward, guitarist of metal band Fozzy whose stage name is "The Duke"
 MC Duke, a British rapper

Albums
 Duke (album) (1980), by Genesis
 The Duke (Jørn Lande album) (2006), by Jørn Lande
 The Duke (Joe Jackson album) (2012)

Songs
 "The Duke", a 1957 jazz standard penned by Dave Brubeck
 "The Duke", a song by Blind Melon from Soup

In print
 Duke: The Life and Times of John Wayne (1985)
 Duke (magazine), a defunct African-American men's magazine
 Duke, a 1949 novel by Hal Ellson

Other uses
 Duke (Lombard), a type of political and military commander of the Lombards, 5th–8th centuries
 The Duke (board game)
 Duke, an old English paper size measuring 7×5.5 inches (178×140 mm)

See also
 Dukes (disambiguation)
 Duke's, an Indian soft drink brand of Duke and Sons